Qusar (also Gusar;) is the capital of Qusar District, Azerbaijan. Qusar is located in the foothills of the Greater Caucasus, over the Qusarchay River, 35 kilometers southwest from Khudat railway station and about 180 km from Baku.

Etymology
According to the Oxford Concise Dictionary of World Place-Names, the word literally means "man" and derives from Lezgian kus.

History

Lermontov's visit

In 1836, Mikhail Lermontov visited Qusar, where he met with scientist-philosopher Haji Ali-efendi. There he heard “Ashiq Qarib” dastan from an eminent ashiq Lazgi Ahmad; he later wrote his famous work “Ashiq Qarib” based on its motifs. A home-museum of the poet is reserved in the city with a memorial plate, inscribed with the famous lines of Lermontov:

20th century

In 1938, Qusar settlement acquired a city status.

21st century

Geography
The city is located not far from Bazarduzu, Shahdagh Mountains and a border with Russia. The mountain river Qusarchay, in honor of which the city acquired its name, flows in Qusar. There is also an artificial lake, Fialka.

Climate
Qusar is located in a zone of subtropical climate and the northern part of the rayon is in zone of mild climate. But because of the heights above the sea level and proximity of the mountains winter is always cold here, and summer is not hot. Temperature of air can change more than 15 degrees during a day. For instance, in summer incessant days-long rains can begin after hot weather.

Demographics
According to the 1916 publication of the Caucasian Calendar, there lived 1,203 people, primarily Russians in Qusar. In 1926, there were 120 Mountain Jews, a number which had increased to 241 by 1939.

According to a census of 1959, at least 7366 people lived in Qusar. According to a census of 1979, population of the city consisted of 12225 people, and in 1989 it reached 14230.

97% of the population consists of Lezgins.

Economy
The economy of Qusar is partially agricultural, partially tourist based, with some industries in operation. There are tinned food, milk and asphalt factories in the city.

Tourism and shopping
Qusar is home to Shahdag Winter Complex, the largest ski resort in Azerbaijan.
Other mountain ranges are popular among tourists.

Culture

Local history museum was established in 1980 and moved into its current building with an area of 1652 sq.m. in 1982. There are 3700 exhibits in the museum.

The Qusar State Art Gallery opened in 1986 in Hil village of Qusar raion was moved to Qusar city in 1998 . 152 works of Azerbaijani artists, including 111 paintings, 34 graphic and 7 sculptural works are on display in the gallery.

In 1998, the State Drama Theatre of Lezgins was opened in Qusar.

Heydar Aliyev Center was built in Heydar Aliyev Memorial Complex in 2012 with the aim of organizing different events and involving young people in various career and personal development activities. The Center features a memorial museum, a library, a reading hall, different conference rooms, and dance, carpet-weaving training centers.

Parks and gardens
Qusar has plenty of parks and gardens, mostly well maintained. The Nariman Narimanov Park is one of the most scenic parks in the city.

Sports

The city has one professional football team, Shahdag Qusar, currently competing in the second-flight of Azerbaijani football, the Azerbaijan First Division.

Transport

Qusar's urban transport system is managed by the Ministry of Transportation.

Education
In 2008, 6 secondary schools, one of which functions in Azerbaijani and 5 in Russian language, were operating in the city. There are also two state run preschools and one private preschool, Panda School, as well as Azerbaijan State Pedagogical College, which trains future teachers of Azerbaijani, English, and elementary school. As of 2016 there are three language schools in the city. The most popular one, Apex English Language School, has been operating in Qusar since 2013.

Honorable residents 

 Makhmud Abilov, Soviet major general, who fought in the Soviet-Georgian War and World War II
 Rafael Amirbekov, footballer, Baku FC's player
 Rahid Amirguliyev, footballer, Khazar Lankaran's player
 Farida Azizova, taekwondo practitioner
 Timofey Borshev, People's Commissar of International Affairs of the Turkmen SSR (1938-1942).
 Gavriil Ilizarov, Soviet physician, known for inventing the Ilizarov apparatus for lengthening limb bones and for his eponymous surgery.
 Sedaget Kerimova, Lezgin writer, poet and journalist

References

External links

 kycap.com

Populated places in Qusar District
1938 establishments in Azerbaijan